Daniel Masuch (born 24 April 1977) is a German former professional football goalkeeper.

References

External links
 

1977 births
Living people
German footballers
SC Paderborn 07 players
Rot-Weiss Essen players
Rot-Weiß Oberhausen players
Kickers Emden players
SC Preußen Münster players
2. Bundesliga players
3. Liga players
Association football goalkeepers
Footballers from Duisburg